Hetschkomyia is a genus of tephritid or fruit flies in the family Tephritidae.

Species
Hetschkomyia maculipennis Hendel, 1914

References

Tephritinae
Tephritidae genera
Taxa named by Friedrich Georg Hendel
Diptera of South America